2,5-Dichloroaniline is an organic compound with the formula C6H3Cl2NH2. One of six isomers of dichloroaniline, it is a colorless solid that is insoluble in water.  It is produced by hydrogenation of 1,4-dichloro-2-nitrobenzene.  It is a precursor to dyes and pigments, e.g., Pigment Yellow 10.

References

Anilines
Chlorobenzenes